Introducing IMx is the fifth album by IMx, formerly known as Immature, released on October 26, 1999, on MCA Records. It peaked at #101 on the Billboard 200 album chart and #31 on the Top R&B/Hip-Hop Albums chart. The album featured the hit single, "Stay the Night", which peaked at No. 23 on the Billboard Hot 100.

Track listing

References

1999 albums
IMx albums
MCA Records albums